Mujibur Rahman Talukder (Died: 30 August 2001) Politician and organizer of the Bangladesh Liberation war in Barguna District who was a Member of Parliament for the then Barguna-3 constituency.

Early life 
Talukder was born in Barguna district. He studied at Islamia College, Calcutta.

Career 
Talukdar was the organizer of the war of liberation and president of the Barguna District Awami League. He was elected a member of the provincial council as an Awami League candidate in the 1970 elections. He was elected as a Member of Parliament from the then Barguna-3 constituency as a candidate of Bangladesh Awami League in the fifth parliamentary elections of 1991 and the seventh parliamentary elections of 12 June 1996.

Death 
Talukder died on 30 August 2001.

References 

5th Jatiya Sangsad members
7th Jatiya Sangsad members
Maulana Azad College alumni
Awami League politicians
People of the Bangladesh Liberation War
20th-century births
2001 deaths
Year of birth missing